A number of different units of measurement were used in Bolivia to measure, for example, mass.  Older system was basically derived from Spain.  In Bolivia,  International Metric system was legally optional since 1871, and  International Metric system has been compulsory since 1893 even though, even in 1890s also, metric system was recognised at the custom-houses and other units which were of Spanish origin was also used.

Pre-Metric Units

A number of units were used in Bolivia, and those units were of Spanish origin.

Mass

Different units were used to measure mass.  One quintal was equal to 46 kg (101.4179 lb).  One quintal was also equal to 4 arrobas.

References

Bolivian culture
Bolivia